Paul Omo Mukairu (born 18 January 2000) is a Nigerian professional footballer who plays as a winger for F.C. Copenhagen.

Career
Mukairu is a youth product of the Nigerian FC Hearts Academy, and moved to the Turkish club Antalyaspor in 2019. He made his professional and Süper Lig debut with Antalyaspor in a 1–0  win over Göztepe S.K. on 18 August 2019. He moved to Anderlecht on loan in the Belgian First Division A for the 2020-21 season, before returning to Antalyaspor. After scoring 8 goals in 53 games in all competitions with Antalyaspor, he transferred to the Danish club F.C. Copenhagen on 27 January 2022 on a 3-year contract.

Club statistics

Honours
Copenhagen
 Danish Superliga: 2021–22

References

External links
 
 
 
 Paul Mukairu at ShyScore

2000 births
Living people
People from Abuja
Nigerian footballers
Association football wingers
Süper Lig players
Belgian Pro League players
Danish Superliga players
Antalyaspor footballers
R.S.C. Anderlecht players
F.C. Copenhagen players
Nigerian expatriate footballers
Nigerian expatriate sportspeople in Turkey
Expatriate footballers in Turkey
Nigerian expatriate sportspeople in Belgium
Expatriate footballers in Belgium
Nigerian expatriate sportspeople in Denmark
Expatriate men's footballers in Denmark